Wednesday Week is an American rock band formed in Los Angeles, California in 1983. After releasing two albums, the band split up in 1990, with members going on to form Lucky. Since 1998 Wednesday Week plays occasional shows with various lineups consisting of previous members.

History
Founders of the band were the sisters Kristi and Kelly Callan—daughters of actress K Callan. The sisters formed their first group, The Undeclared, in 1979. The duo evolved into a trio, Goat Deity, in 1980, when they were joined by Steve Wynn. Wynn left to concentrate on his other band, The Dream Syndicate, and Kjehl Johansen (of The Urinals) joined on bass guitar, with the band name changing again to Narrow Adventure. With David Provost replacing Johansen in 1983, the band became Wednesday Week (named after the Undertones song), and they released their debut EP, Betsy's House, later that year. Further lineup changes followed, with Provost being replaced by Heidi Rodewald at the end of 1983, and Tom Alford joining on lead guitar in early 1984. In 1985, David Nolte (of The Last) replaced Alford, giving the band its most stable lineup.

The band signed with Enigma Records, releasing the Don Dixon-produced debut album What We Had in 1987. Two songs from the album were featured in the film Slumber Party Massacre II, with actresses in the movie miming to the songs. Towards the end of 1987 Rodewald left, and another former Urinals member, John Talley-Jones, joined as one of a string of short-lived members before the band split up in 1990. Before splitting up they self-released a second album, No Going Back  on cassette only.

After Wednesday Week, the Callan sisters and Nolte (who married Kristi Callan) formed Lucky in 1995 with former Mad Parade bassist Mike Lawrence. Nolte and Kristi Callan also played in David Gray's band. Kristi Callan later formed the band Dime Box, releasing the album Five and Dime Waltz in 2008, and Happy in 2019. Rodewald later joined The Negro Problem with Mark "Stew" Stewart, with whom she created the Tony Award-winning musical Passing Strange.

Since 1998, Wednesday Week play occasional live shows with various combinations of past members, with the Callan sisters and Nolte as core members.

Discography

Albums
What We Had (1987), Enigma
No Going Back (1990), Sweden Spins (cassette only)
What We Had (Reissue w/ additional tracks, 2008), Noble Rot

EPs
Betsy's House (1983), WarFrat Grammophone

Singles
"Missionary" (1986), Enigma
"Why" (1986), Enigma
"It's a Steal"/"Special" (1989), P2PR/Unhinged – flexi-disc released with Unhinged fanzine
"The Senses of Our World" (1997)

References

External links

Musical groups established in 1983
Musical groups from Los Angeles
Jangle pop groups